Kakrajan Union is a union of Sakhipur Upazila, Tangail District, Bangladesh.

Demographics
According to the 2011 Bangladesh census, Kakrajan Union had 9,676 households and a population of 38,453. The literacy rate (age 7 and over) was 36% (male: 39.4%, female: 33.1%).

See also
 Union Councils of Tangail District

References

Populated places in Tangail District
Unions of Sakhipur Upazila